Simon Holmes may refer to:

Simon Hugh Holmes (1831–1919), Canadian conservative politician
Simon Holmes (guitarist) (1963–2017), lead singer and guitarist with the Australian rock band The Hummingbirds
Simon Holmes (rugby union) (born 1966), Scottish rugby union player